The ONE Championship (formerly known as "ONE Fighting Championship") promotion was started in 2011.

This list is an up-to-date roster of those fighters currently under contract with the ONE Championship brand. Fighters are organized by weight class and within their weight class by their number of fights with the promotion.

Notes

 Results of fighting within development leagues (ONE Warriors series, ONE Hero series  & Road to ONE) not counted for ONE Championship Records.

Recent signings 
The fighters in this section have either signed with the ONE, have recently returned from an announced retirement, or have yet to make their ONE debut.

Current champions, weight classes and status 
The ONE currently uses ten different weight classes and four sports combat. This list of champions is updated as of February 25, 2023 after ONE Fight Night 7.

Mixed Martial Arts

Heavyweight (265 Ib, 120.2 kg)

Light Heavyweight (225 Ib, 102.1 kg)

Middleweight (205 Ib, 93 kg)

Welterweight (185 Ib, 83.9 kg)

Lightweight (170 Ib, 77.1 kg)

Featherweight (155 Ib, 70.3 kg)

Bantamweight (145 Ib, 65.8 kg)

Flyweight (135 Ib, 61.2 kg)

Strawweight (125 Ib, 56.7 kg)

Women's Flyweight (135 Ib, 61.2 kg)

Women's Strawweight (125 Ib, 56.7 kg)

Women's Atomweight (115 Ib, 52.2 kg)

Unless otherwise cited, all records are retrieved from tapology.com

.

Kickboxing & Muay Thai

Heavyweight (265 Ib, 120.2 kg)

Light Heavyweight (225 Ib, 102.1 kg)

Lightweight (170 Ib, 77.1 kg)

Featherweight (155 Ib, 70.3 kg)

Bantamweight (145 Ib, 65.8 kg)

Flyweight (135 Ib, 61.2 kg)

Strawweight (125 Ib, 56.7 kg)

Women's Strawweight (125 Ib, 56.7 kg)

Women's Atomweight (115 Ib, 52.2 kg) 

.

See also
List of ONE Championship champions
List of ONE Championship alumni
List of ONE Championship events
2023 in ONE Championship
ONE Championship Rankings
List of current UFC fighters
List of current GLORY fighters
List of current ACA fighters
List of current Bellator fighters
List of current Brave CF fighters
List of current Combate Global fighters
List of current Invicta FC fighters
List of current KSW fighters
List of current PFL fighters
List of current Rizin FF fighters
List of current Road FC fighters

References

External links

ONE Championship
Lists of mixed martial artists